Vila Cova may refer to several locations in Portugal:

Vila Cova (Barcelos), a parish in the municipality of Barcelos
Vila Cova (Fafe), a parish in the municipality of Fafe
Vila Cova (Penafiel), a parish in the municipality of Penafiel
Vila Cova (Vila Real), a parish in the municipality of Vila Real
Vila Cova à Coelheira (Seia), a parish in the municipality of Seia
Vila Cova à Coelheira (Vila Nova de Paiva), a parish in the municipality of Vila Nova de Paiva